Kazemi-ye Khalaf (also Romanized as Kāz̧emī-ye Khalaf; also known as Kāzemī, Kāz̧emī Yek, and Kāz̧emī-ye Yek) is a village in Darkhoveyn Rural District, in the Central District of Shadegan County, Khuzestan Province, Iran. At the 2006 census, its population was 176, in 22 families.

References 

Populated places in Shadegan County